Korea Broadcast Advertising Corporation (KOBACO) is the only media representative in South Korea operating as an agency that represents every terrestrial broadcasting company of South Korea for their broadcast advertising sales. KOBACO was established in 1981 and it was re-established as a government-funded public media representative in May 2012.

History

Beginnings 
KOBACO was established in 1981.

1980s 
After its establishment in 1981, KOBACO started broadcast advertising sales on behalf of MBC and KBS. KOBACO moved into the Press Center after its completion in 1985. The following years, KOBACO completed the construction of Namhan River Training Institute (now KOBACO Training Institute) and KOBACO Advertising Academy. In 1987 it established the KOBACO Advertising Academy.

1990s 
In 1991, KOBACO expanded its broadcast advertising sales on behalf of SBS. It also completed the third construction phase for Seoul Arts Center, Arirang Tower, and the Broadcasting Center in the late 1990s.

2000s 
In 2000, the KOBACO act was revised and launched the Ratings Survey Verification Council. In 2003, KOBACO opened the KOBAnet (Korean Broadcasting Advertising Network) and in the following year KOBACO confirmed the launch of terrestrial DMB advertising sales. In 2005, KOBACO reopened the Namhan River Training Institute after putting it under direct management. It also launched the KOBACO Data Express (KODEX) the same year. In 2006, KOBACO opened the KOBACO Advertising Culture Center and established the new KOBACO CI the following year. In 2008, KOBACO opened the Advertising Museum in 2008. In 2009, KOBACO opened the online sales system called ADport and it also held the first Public Service Advertising Festival.

2010s 
In 2010, applicable laws for virtual advertising and PPL were established. In 2012, KOBACO was re-established as the only government-funded public media representative. KOBACO’s area of business expanded from broadcast advertising sales for TV, radio and Digital Multimedia Broadcasting (DMB) to those for cable, IPTV, and satellite broadcasting.

Structure
KOBACO is an independently managed public corporation (공사,公社) funded by the South Korean government. KOBACO consists of several departments which could be listed as follows:

Industry Development & Support 
The Industry Development & Support consists of Advertising Promotion Division, Public Service Division and Advertising Infrastructure Team. As the only government funded advertising management representative of South Korea, the aforementioned divisions engage in diverse business with the goal to improve the general industry and promote public interests. Since its establishment in 1981, KOBACO raised awareness of social issues through broadcasting PSA (public service advertisement). It also operates the Advertising Museum, Advertising Academy, KOBACO Training Institute, Advertising Library and Advertising Research Institute.

Media Business Headquarter 
The Media Business Headquarter consists of Media Policy Division, New Business Development Division, and Marketing Research Team. The Media Business Department carries out the MCR (Media & Consumer Research) and announces the PEI index. It is equipped with IT Infrastructure such as KOBAnet and KODEX. KOBAnet is a comprehensive IT e-commerce broadcast advertising system which is designed for advertisement agencies to manage the process of purchasing broadcast ads. KODEX is a digital expressway for broadcast advertising distribution. Through broadcast advertising it supports small and medium-sized businesses while expanding its domain to DMB and New Media. It is recently expanding its relations with media advertisement agencies and supporting foreign media agencies that wish to advertise in Korea and vice versa. The New Business Development Division consists of New Media Business Team and Global Business Team. The Global Business Team focuses on linking clients in both Korea and overseas who wish to advertise on print or broadcast stations. KOBACO provides international advertisers with customized solutions and utilizes its work agreement with WPP to assist clients' marketing strategies.

Sales Headquarter 
The Sales Headquarter consists of Sales Division I, II, Sales Planning Team and branches in Busan, Daegu, Gwangju and Daejeon. KOBACO expanded its business to MSO, IPTY and cable programs after the Act on Proxy Sales of Broadcast Advertising, ETC. became effective in May 2012.

KOBACO Foundation

KOBACO Advertising Academy 
KOBACO Advertising Academy is the first domestic advertising educational institute officially recognized by the International Advertising Association (IAA) in 1999. Since 2007 it began providing training programs to potential employees and those interested in learning more about advertisement.

KOBACO Advertising Museum 
The KOBACO Advertising Museum holds eight exhibitions ranging from history of Korean society through advertising to advertising with major social impacts. The museum is used as an educational venue about advertising developments and its digital archive has about 45,000 ads from 1886 to the present.

KOBACO Advertising Culture Center 
The Advertising Culture Center opened in 2006 as the collective space to accommodate the KOBACO Advertising Academy, Library, Museum, and Research Institute. Korea Federation of Advertising Associations, Korea Advertising Society, Korea Association of Advertising Agencies, and Korea Commercial Film Maker Union can also be found here.

Affiliated organization

Korea Public Service Advertisement Council 
The Korea Public Service Advertisement Council (Hangul: 공익광고협의회, hanja: 公益廣告協議會) is an organization under the Korea Broadcasting Advertisement Promotion Corporation, and is composed of around 20 prominent figures representing all walks of life such as advertising academia, media, broadcasting, advertising, and civic groups. The main task is the production of public service advertisements (broadcast public service advertisements, printed public service advertisements), and public service advertisements above a certain level are organized through broadcasting in accordance with broadcasting related laws.

References

Government-owned companies of South Korea
Advertising agencies of South Korea
Broadcasting in South Korea
Public service announcement organizations
1981 establishments in South Korea